Robson Severino da Silva (born 10 July 1983), known simply as Robson, is a Brazilian former professional footballer who played as a central defender.

Club career
Born in Recife, Pernambuco, Robson played lower league football in his early years. In June 2005 he signed a six-month contract with Mogi Mirim Esporte Clube of the third division, then joined Associação Olímpica de Itabaiana in the League of Sergipe state.

In the summer of 2006, Robson signed for Portuguese second level club Gondomar S.C. and, the following season, at the age of 24, made his Primeira Liga debut – in his country or abroad – with Vitória de Setúbal. His first game in the competition was on 19 August 2007, as he played the full 90 minutes in a 1–1 away draw against Vitória de Guimarães.

On 7 July 2009, after having helped the Sadinos consecutively retain their status and only missing a combined three matches, Robson stayed in the country, agreeing to a three-year deal with C.S. Marítimo after having arrived for free. He made an average of 20 league appearances during his spell in Madeira.

Again as a free agent, on 19 September 2012, Robson moved to Belgian First Division A side Oud-Heverlee Leuven. In the 2014 off-season, following his team's relegation to the second tier, he rejoined his former coach Ronny Van Geneugden at Waasland-Beveren.

Honours
Vitória de Setúbal
Taça da Liga: 2007–08

References

External links

1983 births
Living people
Sportspeople from Recife
Brazilian footballers
Association football defenders
Campeonato Brasileiro Série C players
Mogi Mirim Esporte Clube players
Primeira Liga players
Liga Portugal 2 players
Segunda Divisão players
Gondomar S.C. players
Vitória F.C. players
C.S. Marítimo players
Belgian Pro League players
Oud-Heverlee Leuven players
S.K. Beveren players
Brazilian expatriate footballers
Expatriate footballers in Portugal
Expatriate footballers in Belgium
Brazilian expatriate sportspeople in Portugal
Brazilian expatriate sportspeople in Belgium